Paul Runar Collander (1 May 1894 Vyborg – 25 May 1973 Helsinki) was a Finnish botanist. He was an adjunct professor of plant physiology at the University of Helsinki from 1935 to 1939, and professor of botany from 1939 to 1961. He gained international acclaim for his research on the effect of molecular size and solubility ratios on the ability of substances to penetrate the cell membrane. He presented the "lipoid filter theory" of permeability and further developed it. Collander also wrote several works on the history of botany.

Selected works

References

1894 births
1973 deaths
20th-century Finnish botanists
Academic staff of the University of Helsinki
Scientists from Vyborg
Plant physiologists